Commanding Right and Forbidding Wrong in Islamic Thought is a 2000 non-fiction book about Enjoining good and forbidding wrong in Islam by Michael Cook. The book is a winner of  Albert Hourani Book Award and Farabi Award

Reception
The book has been reviewed by Donna Robinson Divine and Ulrike Freitag.

References 

2000 non-fiction books
English-language books
Books by Michael Cook (historian)